The Selkirk Subdivision is a railroad line owned by CSX Transportation in the U.S. state of New York. The line runs from Selkirk northwest to Amsterdam along a former New York Central Railroad line. At its southeast end, at Selkirk Yard, the Selkirk Subdivision becomes the Castleton Subdivision. Its northwest end is at the east end of the Mohawk Subdivision, and it junctions the Carman Subdivision at Rotterdam and the Hudson Subdivision at Hoffmans.

Amtrak's Empire Service, Lake Shore Limited, and Maple Leaf operate over the Selkirk Subdivision northwest of Hoffmans.

History
The oldest piece of the Selkirk Subdivision is that northwest of Hoffmans, opened in 1836 by the Utica and Schenectady Railroad. The Saratoga and Hudson River Railroad opened in 1866 from Schenectady to Athens, including the current Selkirk Subdivision between Unionville (near Selkirk Yard) and Fullers. The line from Fullers northwest to near Pattersonville opened in 1884 as part of the New York, West Shore and Buffalo Railway. The Hoffmans Connection across the Hudson River between Pattersonville and Hoffmans opened in 1900, and the final piece, from Unionville southeast to Selkirk Yard, was opened in 1924 by the Hudson River Connecting Railroad. With this final opening, the Selkirk Subdivision became a bypass of Albany for traffic between the west and either Boston or New York City. The entire line became part of the New York Central Railroad and Conrail through leases, mergers and takeovers, and was assigned to CSX Transportation in the 1999 breakup of Conrail. (Prior to the breakup, Conrail's Selkirk Branch ran from the Hudson Subdivision in Stuyvesant north and west along what are now known as the Schodack Subdivision and Castleton Subdivision before reaching the current Selkirk Subdivision, and ended at Hoffmans.)

See also
 List of CSX Transportation lines

References

CSX Transportation lines
Rail infrastructure in New York (state)
New York Central Railroad lines